João Pedro Moreira Mendes (born 22 March 1988 in Ermesinde, Porto District) is a Portuguese former professional footballer who played as a forward.

References

External links

1988 births
Living people
Sportspeople from Porto District
Portuguese footballers
Association football forwards
Primeira Liga players
Liga Portugal 2 players
Segunda Divisão players
S.C. Braga B players
Merelinense F.C. players
G.D. Ribeirão players
Varzim S.C. players
Rio Ave F.C. players
Portimonense S.C. players
Leixões S.C. players
F.C. Famalicão players
Lusitânia F.C. players
F.C. Vizela players
Portugal youth international footballers